Podhale State Vocational University in Nowy Targ ( (PPUZ)) is a public vocational university in Nowy Targ, Poland. It was founded in 2001, following the initiative of the Lesser Poland voivodeship's authorities. Over 90% of students at PPUZ come from Podhale, Spiš and Orava.

PPUZ is the highest situated university in Poland (615 m above sea level).

History 
Podhale State Higher Vocational School in Nowy Targ ( (PPWSZ)) was founded in 2001 and was renamed as Podhale State Vocational University in Nowy Targ in October 2019.

University authorities 
 Rector – dr Maria Zięba (acting)
 Vice-rector for student affairs and education – dr Maria Zięba
 Vice-rector for science and projects – dr Krzysztof Waśkowski 
 Rector's Plenipotentiary for Cooperation and Development – dr Bianka Godlewska-Dzioboń
 Chancellor – mgr Andrzej Sasuła
 Quaestor – mgr Małgorzata Maciaś
 Director of the Medical Institute – dr hab. Zbigniew Doniec, prof. PPUZ
 Director of the Institute of Health – dr Piotr Kurzeja
 Director of the Technical Institute – mgr inż. arch. Agata Bentkowska
 Director of the Humanities and Social Institute – dr Małgorzata Wesołowska
 Director of the Podhale Center of Economic Sciences – dr Paweł Zamora

Rectors
 prof. dr hab.  (from 2001 to 2012);
 dr hab.  (from 2012 to 2016);
 ks. płk (r) dr hab.  (from September 2016 to March 2020)
 dr hab. Robert Włodarczyk, prof. PPUZ (from June 2020 to December 2021)

Fields of study 
PPUZ offers education in ten fields of study at two levels: first-cycle (bachelor's and engineering studies) and second-cycle (master's studies).
 Architecture – first-cycle and second-cycle
 National security – first-cycle
 Dietetics – first-cycle
 Finance and accounting – first-cycle
 Accounting and economic analytics – second-cycle
 English Philology – first-cycle and second-cycle
 Physiotherapy – long-cycle master's studies and second-cycle
 Cosmetology – first-cycle and second-cycle
 Spatial management – first-cycle
 Nursing – first-cycle and second-cycle
 Social work – first-cycle
 Medical rescue – first-cycle
 Sports – first-cycle
 Tourism and Recreation – first-cycle and second-cycle

The university also offers postgraduate studies:
 Functionality and aesthetics of public space
 Personal trainer with English
 Tourism business management with English
 Information management in a contemporary library

Student organizations 
 Klub Uczelniany AZS PPUZ
 Uczelniany Klub Sportowy Recreo
 Klub Uczelniany Sportów Zimowych „Kusz”
 Uczelniany Zespół Góralski „Młode Podhale”
 Studenckie Radio Fala Podhala

Science clubs 
 Koło Naukowe Pielęgniarstwa Psychiatrycznego
 Koło Naukowe „Internurse”
 Koło Naukowe „Fizjomaster”
 Koło Naukowe „Akson”
 Koło Naukowe „Kalliope”
 Koło Naukowe „Ratownik”
 Koło Naukowe „Kosmetoscience”
 Koło Naukowe „Ad Quadratum”
 Koło Naukowe „Modulor”
 Koło Naukowe Ekonomii i Rachunkowości „Skner”
 Studenckie Koło Naukowe Języka Angielskiego
 Podhalańskie Koło Naukowe Turystyki
 Działalność w Studenckim Radio Fala Podhala
 Koło Naukowe Studentów Pracy Socjalnej

EU projects 
 Project "Improving the quality of higher education in nursing at PPUZ in Nowy Targ, which will translate into increased interest in nursing studies and thus contribute to the education of an additional number of graduates"
 Project "Development and implementation of the development program of the field of nursing PPUZ in Nowy Targ and the creation of a monoprofile medical simulation center"
 Project "Dual studies in the field of finance and accounting - practical profile at the Podhale Center of Economic Sciences"
 Project "Podhale Digital Library (PBC)"

Plagiarism scandal 
Rector Stanisław Gulak was dismissed from his post on March 17, 2020, by the decision of the Minister of Science and Higher Education, Jarosław Gowin. The rector was charged with plagiarism. A disciplinary prosecutor found as many as 74 borrowed fragments from 8 other publications in the clergyman's habilitation thesis. Rector Stanisław Gulak, however, assured of his innocence, and the Council of the PPUZ in Nowy Targ issued an opinion on the reliability of his scientific achievements. Currently, the case of plagiarism is being clarified by the prosecutor's office, and an inspection has been ordered in the PPUZ in Nowy Targ.

References

External links 
 The official website of the Podhale State Vocational University in Nowy Targ

Universities and colleges in Poland
Nowy Targ County